Kemer Dam is a dam in Bozdoğan, Aydın, Turkey, built between 1954 and 1958. The development was backed by the Turkish State Hydraulic Works. In 2016 the dam got privatized and in 2017 Aydın Metropolitan Municipality decided to open the doors of the Arapapıştı Canyon to tourists. The canyon is connected to the dam.

See also

List of dams and reservoirs in Turkey

References
DSI directory, State Hydraulic Works (Turkey), Retrieved December 16, 2009

Dams in Aydın Province
Hydroelectric power stations in Turkey
Dams completed in 1958